Zhenqi Barthel (Sun Zhenqi; born 9 January 1987) is a German table tennis player of Chinese origin. In 2002, she moved to Essen, Germany, where she became a resident athlete of TuS Holsterhausen, and trained for the table tennis team, under her personal coaches Jörg Bitzigeio and Wang Zhi. Three years later, she was adopted by the couple Barthel, changed her surname, and obtained a German citizenship. As of March 2013, Barthel is ranked no. 66 in the world by the International Table Tennis Federation (ITTF). She is also right-handed, and uses the shakehand grip.

Barthel qualified for the inaugural women's team event at the 2008 Summer Olympics in Beijing, by receiving a spot as one of the remaining top 10 teams from ITTF's Computer Team Ranking List. Playing with fellow Chinese-born teammate Wu Jiaduo and Olympic veteran Elke Schall, Barthel placed fourth in the preliminary pool round, against Hong Kong, Poland, and Romania, with a total score of three points, and three straight losses.

At the 2009 European Championships in Stuttgart, Barthel and her partner Kristin Silbereisen won a bronze medal in the women's doubles match, and shared their triumph with the Eastern European duo Oksana Fadeyeva (Russia) and Rūta Paškauskienė (Lithuania). Four years later, Barthel captured a silver medal, along with Shan Xiaona, in the same tournament at the ITTF 2013 World Tour Qatar Open in Doha, losing out to the formidable Chinese duo and Olympic champions Ding Ning and Li Xiaoxia (8–11, 11–9, 7–11, 9–11).

References

External links
 
 NBC Olympics Profile

1987 births
Living people
German female table tennis players
Table tennis players at the 2008 Summer Olympics
Olympic table tennis players of Germany
Chinese emigrants to Germany
Sportspeople from Essen
People from Fuxin
Table tennis players from Liaoning
Naturalised table tennis players